Rafael Caldeira Pires (born 11 February 1991), known as Rafael Caldeira, is a Brazilian footballer who plays for Jaraguá as a central defender.

Club career

Early career
Born in Monte Alto, São Paulo, He was revealed by MAC, where he stayed from 2005 to 2009.
Caldera became professional in the MAC in early 2009. After the play the Copa São Paulo de Juniores for the Tiger, the defender was incorporated into the first team, who played the Paulistão. He plays some games for MAC and did not take long to transfer to Santos FC.

Santos and loans
Caldeira had one game for Santos Futebol Clube professional team, and this debut game was the Santos vs Corinthians (The Alvinegro's Duel), in 22/09/10. He started before the half-time as a substitute, because the injury of Bruno Aguiar. Santos was defeated by Corinthians by 3-2, with a Corinthians' irregular goal.

Caldeira helped Santos to reach the final of the Copa São Paulo de Futebol Júnior 2010, but with a controversial refereeing decision that the team lost by 3–0 on penalties after a 1–1 tie in regulation time. On August 2011, he was loaned to Série B club ABC.

On 16 May 2012, Caldeira was loaned again, this time to Bragantino. On 8 December, he was loaned to Botafogo-SP, alongside two other players.

Anti-doping rule violation
In 2015 Caldeira received a public warning after testing positive for the banned steroid medication Dexamethasone.

Career statistics

References

External links

1991 births
Living people
Footballers from São Paulo (state)
Brazilian footballers
Association football defenders
Santos FC players
Marília Atlético Clube players
ABC Futebol Clube players
Clube Atlético Bragantino players
Mirassol Futebol Clube players
Botafogo Futebol Clube (SP) players
Guarani FC players
Paulista Futebol Clube players
Itumbiara Esporte Clube players
Nova Iguaçu Futebol Clube players
Central Sport Club players
Operário Futebol Clube (MS) players
Esporte Clube Democrata players
Jaraguá Esporte Clube players
Desportiva Ferroviária players
Doping cases in association football
Brazilian sportspeople in doping cases
People from Monte Alto, São Paulo